Darroll Bradley Powe (born June 22, 1985) is a Canadian former professional ice hockey player who played six seasons in the National Hockey League (NHL) for the Philadelphia Flyers, Minnesota Wild, and New York Rangers.

Playing career
Powe attended Princeton University and, while earning his degree in sociology, played on its hockey team for four years. He was an alternate captain in his junior year, and captain in his senior year.

The Philadelphia Flyers signed the undrafted Powe as a free agent on May 9, 2008, after Powe had played on the Flyers American Hockey League affiliate, the Philadelphia Phantoms, in 2006–07 and 2007–08. Powe made his NHL debut on October 24, 2008, against the New Jersey Devils. After being sent back down to the Phantoms, Powe returned to the Flyers lineup for good in December and played the remainder of the 2008–09 season with the Flyers. On December 9, 2008, he scored his first career NHL goal against Yann Danis of the New York Islanders. A restricted free agent following the 2009–10 season, Powe signed a one-year contract on July 22, 2010.

Powe is generally regarded to be a role player and has excellent penalty killing skills. Another of his strengths is his forechecking prowess.

On June 27, 2011, the Flyers traded Powe to the Minnesota Wild for a third-round pick in the 2013 NHL Entry Draft. After the trade, on July 5, 2011, Powe signed a contract with the Wild worth $3.2 million during three years.

On February 4, 2013, Powe was traded by the Wild, along with forward Nick Palmieri, to the New York Rangers in exchange for veteran forward Mike Rupp.

On August 13, 2014, Powe signed a one-year contract with the Lehigh Valley Phantoms and served as an alternate captain that season. He retired following the season.

Career statistics

Personal life
Powe was born in Saskatoon, Saskatchewan but lived his adolescence in Ottawa, Ontario. He attended Earl of March Secondary School.

References

External links

 

1985 births
Living people
Canadian ice hockey centres
Canadian ice hockey left wingers
Hartford Wolf Pack players
Ice hockey people from Saskatchewan
Lehigh Valley Phantoms players
Minnesota Wild players
New York Rangers players
Philadelphia Flyers players
Philadelphia Phantoms players
Princeton Tigers men's ice hockey players
Sportspeople from Saskatoon
Undrafted National Hockey League players